The "Honour of the Nation" Decoration is the highest decoration to be given in Albania, among the Civil awards and decorations of Albania, and was instituted by special law No. 8113, of 28 March 1996, entitled Për dekoratat në Republikën e Shqipërisë, later amended by law  No. 112/2013 Për dekoratat, titujt e nderit, medaljet dhe titujt vendorë të nderit në Republikën e Shqipërisë.

This award is granted to Albanian citizens or Foreign nationals, who by their acts and good name contribute to honouring the Albanian nation, inside and outside of the country. The proposal might come from the President of the Republic himself, but also from the institutions included and foreseen in the Rules of Procedures about medals and by Speaker of the Assembly, Prime Minister independent institutions according to the respective field.

Recipients

Albania national football team
Pjetër Arbnori
Fadil Berisha
Eqrem Çabej
Dora d'Istria
Ibrahim Dalliu
Kristo Dako (11 July 2017)
Sulejman Delvina
Gjergj Fishta
Kadri Gjata
Zenel Gjoleka
Universiteti "Luigj Gurakuqi"
Azem Hajdari
Tonin Harapi
Mirash Ivanaj
Rexhep Jella
Sadik Kaceli
Ismail Kadare
Majlinda Kelmendi
Ibrahim Kodra
Biblioteka Kombëtare
Mustafa Krantja
Bashkia Kukës
Marie Logoreci
Petro Marko
Gjin Marku
Kel Marubi
Inva Mula
Behgjet Pacolli
Panajot Pano
Odhise Paskali
Rosen Plevneliev
Zef Pllumi
Gjerasim Qiriazi (11 July 2017)
Gjergj Qiriazi (11 July 2017)
Parashqevi Qiriazi (11 July 2017)
Sevasti Qiriazi (11 July 2017)
Refik Resmja
Robert Shvarc
Nako Spiru
Shoqata “Tirana”
Refik Toptani
Jakov Xoxa
Kahreman Ylli
Vaçe Zela
Petro Zheji
Rexh Xhakli
Jim Belushi
Nora Gjakova
Distria Krasniqi

See also
Orders, decorations and medals of Albania

External links
 Document Nation's Honour Order found in the 2006 page of the President of Albania webpage.

References

Decoration
Awards established in 1996
1996 establishments in Albania